Sher Punjab Da is a 1994 Pakistani action film. directed by Shahid Rana and produced by Babar Butt Goga. Film starring actor Sultan Rahi, Gori, Saima and Ilyas Kashmiri.

Cast
 Sultan Rahi – Shahiya Punjab 
 Saima – (love interest of Sultan Rahi)
 Gori 
 Abid Ali
 Tanzeem Hassan
 Bahar Begum
 Naghma – (mother of Shahiya)
 Humayun Qureshi
 Munawar Saeed
 Ilyas Kashmiri
 Tariq Shah
 Adeeb
 Saleem Hasan
 Khawar Abbas
 Hadiar Abbas

Track list
The music of the film is composed by Wajahat Attre. The lyrics are written by Khawaja Pervez, Waris Ludhyanvi, and Yasin Hazin, and the singer is Noor Jehan.

References

Pakistani action films
1994 films
Punjabi-language Pakistani films
1990s Punjabi-language films
1994 action films